Lhozhag County, is a county of Shannnan located in the south-east of the Tibet Autonomous Region.

Geography 
Lhozhag Nub Qu is situated in Lhozhag County.

References 

Counties of Tibet
Shannan, Tibet